This is a list of primary and secondary schools in the Asian country of Syria.  Tertiary schools are presented separately in the list of universities in Syria.

Aleppo
Schools in the city of Aleppo include:

Private schools

 AGBU Armenian Central High School
 Al-Awdeh High School
 Al-Kalimah High School
 Al-Marefa High School
 Al-Mumayazoon High School
 Al-Shahbaa High School
 Aleppo College
 Cilician Armenian High School
 Collège des Freres Maristes
 Collège Janne d'Arc
 École Amal
 George & Matilde Salem High School
 Grtasirats Armenian High School
 Ibn Hayan High School
 International School of Aleppo
 Karen Jeppe Armenian College
 Lycée Farah Privé
 Lycée Franciscaines Missionnaires de Marie
 Lycée Français d'Alep
 Lycée Immaculée Conception d'Alep
 Mechitarian School of Aleppo
 National School of Aleppo
 Shams al-Assil School
 The British Syrian School

State-owned schools

 Abd al-Rahman al-Kawakibi High School
 Al-Amin School
 Al-Hikmeh School
 Al-Kindi High School
 Al-Maʿarri High School
 Al-Ma'mun High School
 Al-Mutanabbi High School
 Al-Quds High School
 Basil al-Assad High School
 Dimashq School
 Djamila Bouhired School
 Huda Shaarawi High School
 Ibn al-Baitar High School
 Ibn Sina High School
 Ibn Zaydún High School
 Ibrahim Hananu High School
 Martyrs' High School
 Mazen Dabbagh High School
 Michael Kashour School
 Musa bin Nusair School
 Nablus High School
 Orouba High School
 Zaki al-Arsuzi High School

Al-Hamah
Schools in the village of Al-Hamah include:

 Omar Bin Abdul Aziz School

Damascus
Schools in the city of Damascus include:

Al-Bashaer School 
Al-Watanieh National School
Ahmed Asaa'd Kadek School
 Al-Awael Typical High School
 Al-Bassel High School for Outstanding Students
 Damascus Community School
 Hassan ibn Thabit School
 International Montessori School
 International School of Choueifat
 Jawdat Alhashimi Secondary School
 Little Village School
 Lycée Charles de Gaulle
 Mohamed Ahmed Gera School
 Pakistan International School of Damascus
 Saa'd Haj Ali School
 Syrian Modern School
 The Britan Syrian School
AL Saade High School
Dar Al Hekmah High School

Homs
Schools in the city of Homs include:

 Al-Bassel High School for Outstanding Students
 Al-Ghassania Private School
 Al Khairia School
 International School of Choueifat
 National Evangelical School

Latakia
Schools in the city of Latakia include:

 Al Sham Oasis Private School (Arabic: واحة الشام)
 National Orthodox College (الكلية الوطنية)
 Jules Jammal High School (Arabic: جول جمال)

Tartus
Schools in the city of Tartus include:

Private
 Al-Andalus Private school
 Al-Khulood Private School
 Phoenix Private School

State-owned schools
 Ibrahim Hanano Elementary

See also

 Education in Syria
 Lists of schools

Schools
Schools
Syria
Syria

Schools